Elton Chong (real name Jeong Jin Hwa) was born in 1955 and is a Korean martial artist, action director, and actor. Elton Chong has mostly worked in South Korea with actors such as Eagle Han-ying, Casanova Wong, Michael Wong and Dragon Lee. While most of his work is with the director Kim Jeong Yong, Elton Chong often appeared in Godfrey Ho's movies, especially Hong Kong movies that were imported into Korea. He is perhaps best known for the movie Shaolin Drunken Monkey (known in Korea as The Shaolin Chief Cook.).

Beginning of the career
Elton Chong was first discovered by the director Lee Doo Young. He debuted as an extra in Charles Han's 1974 Korean action movie Korean Connection. During the late 1970s Elton Chong worked mostly as a stunt man or playing just minor roles. He also appeared in Sammo Hung's The Shaolin Plot  as an extra and also made a brief appearance in Jackie Chan's Dragon Fist as an extra.

Career in 1980s
Elton gradually accelerated his career during the late 1980s when he started to work with the director Kim Jeong Yong. By this period after the Hong Kong martial art actor Jackie Chan hit the scene with the movies such as Drunken Master, The Fearless Hyena and The Young Master, in Korea some of the directors desperately looked for the Korean star for the next hit. Like the Korean actor Dragon Lee (who was Bruce Lee imitator in Korea.) the directors looked for the imitators of Jackie Chan since by this period the comedy kung fu was major hit in Korea. Elton Chong finally made his first starring role in the movie Shaolin Drunken Monkey where he acts in similar ways to Jackie Chan's comedic kung fu template. Although his first starring role movie didn't amazed the whole world but Elton Chong quickly became famous in Korea. Some of his movies are often copied the Jackie Chan style of kung fu. For instance Elton Chong's 1982 movie Invincible Obsessed Fighter some how copied the idea from The Fearless Hyena. Even though Elton Chong's work did not amazed the world, his film legacy made Elton Chong's career continued during the 1980s period and he became famous in South Korea and often fans recall him as a "the king of comedy kung fu in Korea".

End of the career and present
After he took a last film Double Bed Trouble in South Korea, he retired from the acting. Although he continued on working on the action director since he had experience with the stunt experience. He directed the action sequences in Dragon Lee's early 90s gangster movies such as Blues of Chong Ro and Nationwide Constituency series in Korea. After that, Elton Chong started to work as a businessman, and he is now working on his own business company until these days. He also made a cameo appearance in 2003's TV Drama The Age of Fighting.

Filmography
 Korean Connection (1974) - extra
 Gate of Destiny (1974) - extra
 The Successor (1974) - extra
 Black Leopard (1974) - extra 
 Tiger of Northland (1975) - extra
 Tomb for a Strongman (1975) - extra
 Secret Rivals (1975) - Black Fox (Silver Fox's Student)
 Special Mission (1976)
 The Best Disciple (1976) 
 Secret Agent (1976) 
 Black Dragon River (1976) - head of the gym
 Deadly Roulette (1976) - extra
 Deadly Kick (1976) -extra
 Death Fist (1976) - thug
 The 18 Amazones (1977) - (intro)
 Lone Shaolin Avenger (1977) - one of 3 bodyguards
 Return of the Red Tiger (1977) - villain
 Shaolin Plot (1977) - Monk, extra
 Wonderman from Shaolin (1977) - villain
 Dragon Fist (1979) - extra 
 The Magnificent (1979) - attacks General
 Shaolin Drunken Monkey (1981) - as Mo
 Magnificent Natural Fist (1981) - as Mo
 10 Shaolin Disciples (1981)
 Invincible Obsessed Fighter (1982)
 The Snake Strikes Back (1982)
 The Undertaker in Sohwa Province (1983) - as Eltang Chan
 Fist of Golden Monkey (1983)
 Dragon Against Vampire (1985)
 Fighter of Death (1986)
 Ninja of the Magnificent (1987)
 Hamburger Johnny (1988)
 The Super Ninja Master (1989)
 Double Bed Trouble (1989)
 Back to Even (1992)
 The Age of Fighting (2003)

References

External links

www.rarekungfumovies.com

South Korean male television actors
South Korean male film actors
1955 births
Living people
Hong Kong male film actors